Pablo Mastroeni (born August 29, 1976) is an Argentine born American soccer coach and former player who is the head coach of Major League Soccer club Real Salt Lake. He was formerly head coach of the Colorado Rapids, and assistant coach of the Houston Dynamo.

Early life and education
Mastroeni moved to the United States from Argentina with his family at the age of four, settling in Phoenix, Arizona. He attended Thunderbird High School, and played youth soccer for the Santos Futbol Clube. Mastroeni attended North Carolina State University where he played on the men's soccer team from 1994 to 1997.  From 1995 to 1997, he spent the collegiate off season playing for the Tucson Amigos of the USISL.

Playing career

Professional
In February 1998, the Miami Fusion selected Mastroeni in the second round (thirteenth overall) of the 1998 MLS College Draft.
He played four seasons with the Fusion, becoming a regular starter in his second year with the team in either central defense or defensive midfield, and was named to the MLS Best XI in 2001.

The Fusion was contracted after the 2001 season and Mastroeni was the first overall choice of the 2002 MLS Allocation Draft, going to the Colorado Rapids, whom he captained to their first title in 2010. Mastroeni scored his first MLS playoff goal against the Columbus Crew on October 28, 2010.

Mastroeni was traded to the Los Angeles Galaxy in June 2013 and retired at the end of the season.

In 2021, Mastroeni's #25 was retired by the Colorado Rapids.  This was the first number retired by the Colorado Rapids.

International career

Mastroeni earned his first U.S. cap against Ecuador on June 7, 2001. When Chris Armas went out with an injury just weeks prior to the 2002 World Cup, Mastroeni found himself a starter in the opening game as the U.S. defeated Portugal 3–2.

On January 10, 2005, it was reported that he tore the quadriceps in his left leg and would be out for six to eight weeks. The injury happened while training with the national team.

Mastroeni was named to the 2006 U.S. World Cup squad. In a FIFA World Cup 2006 match against Italy on June 17, Mastroeni was given a red card for an aggressive tackle in the first half. Mastroeni was fined CHF 7,500 and received a three-game suspension, thus missing the last U.S. match of the World Cup and the first two matches of the 2007 CONCACAF Gold Cup.

On February 7, 2007, during a friendly between the United States and Mexico, Mastroeni was the team captain.

Mastroeni was called up for the United States' first World Cup qualifying match of 2010 and two third-round matches, and started three of the first five final round matches for the United States. However, he was not named to the Confederations Cup roster nor any of the squads for the final five qualifiers for the United States.

Coaching

Colorado Rapids

2014
Mastroeni was named the interim head coach of the Colorado Rapids after Oscar Pareja left for FC Dallas in January 2014. He was named head coach of the Rapids on March 8, 2014, one week before the 2014 season began.

In 2014, Mastroeni and the Rapids experienced the worst Rapids season in the 34 game MLS era. Allowing the most goals in the MLS, 62, the Rapids finished second to last in the Western Conference with 32 points.

2015
2015 was another unsuccessful campaign for Mastroeni. The Rapids ended the season last in the Western Conference and second to last in the overall standings, receiving the second overall pick in the upcoming MLS Superdraft.

2016
During the offseason before the 2016 season, Mastroeni visited London, spending several days watching Arsenal and Tottenham train. While there, he analyzed the coaching styles of Tottenham's Mauricio Pochettino and Arsenal's Arsène Wenger, before he traveled to Orlando to attend a supplementary coaching course. Mastroeni helped the Rapids establish a team identity in 2016, a defensive based team which operated out of the 4-2-3-1 formation. This identity helped the Rapids to their best regular season record of all time, with a franchise low 6 losses and a franchise high of 58 points. The team allowed an MLS low 32 goals in 2016. Mastroeni finished second in voting for the annual MLS Coach of the Year award.

2017
In the offseason, Mastroeni signed a three-year contract extension, through 2019. On August 15, Mastroeni was fired as Head Coach and replaced by Steve Cooke.

Houston Dynamo 
In 2020, Mastroeni was named as an assistant coach for the Houston Dynamo

Real Salt Lake

2021
In 2021, Mastroeni was named as an assistant coach for Real Salt Lake On August 27, 2021, he was named the interim head coach upon Freddy Juarez's unexpected midseason departure. On December 13, 2021, Mastroeni was named permanent head coach of the club for the 2022 season.

Coaching statistics

Honors

United States
CONCACAF Gold Cup Champions: 2002, 2005, 2007

Miami Fusion
Major League Soccer Supporters Shield: 2001

Colorado Rapids
Major League Soccer Western Conference Championship: 2010
Major League Soccer MLS Cup:2010

Individual
MLS Best XI: 2001
 CONCACAF Gold Cup All-Tournament team: 2007

References

External links 

1976 births
Living people
2002 CONCACAF Gold Cup players
2002 FIFA World Cup players
2003 FIFA Confederations Cup players
2003 CONCACAF Gold Cup players
2005 CONCACAF Gold Cup players
2006 FIFA World Cup players
2007 CONCACAF Gold Cup players
American people of Italian descent
American soccer players
Argentine emigrants to the United States
Argentine footballers
Argentine people of Italian descent
Association football midfielders
Colorado Rapids coaches
Colorado Rapids players
CONCACAF Gold Cup-winning players
Houston Dynamo FC non-playing staff
LA Galaxy players
Major League Soccer All-Stars
Major League Soccer coaches
Major League Soccer players
Miami Fusion draft picks
Miami Fusion players
MLS Pro-40 players
NC State Wolfpack men's soccer players
Soccer players from Phoenix, Arizona
Sportspeople from Mendoza, Argentina
Sportspeople from Phoenix, Arizona
Tucson Amigos players
United States men's international soccer players
A-League (1995–2004) players
USL League Two players
Argentine football managers